Fan-der-Flit is a noble merchant family

The noble branch, descendant of Timofey Yefremovich Fan-der-Flit, who entered the service in 1790 and was promoted to the rank privy councillor, on 2 November 1828, was awarded nobility with a diploma, from which a copy is held in the Herold Office.

Description of the coat of arms 
The shield is divided horizontally into two parts, in the upper part, in the black field, there is a lion holding a silver arrow in its paw, pointing upward, and in the lower part, in the silver field, a ship at sea with outstretched sails sailing to the left.

The shield is topped by a noble helmet and a crown with three ostrich feathers. The mantling on the shield is red and black, enclosed in silver.

Family representatives 

 Ivan (Johannes) Fan-der-Flit
 Peter Ivanovich
 Pyotr Petrovich (1839—1904) — Russian physicist, professor since 1880 of the Saint Petersburg State University
 Alexander Petrovich (1870—1941) — famous Russian engineer and mechanical sciencist
 Konstantin Petrovich (1844—1933) — Russian military leader
 Yefrem Ivanovich
 Timofey Yefremovich (1775—1843) — Arkhangelsk vice-governor, Olonets governor
 Fyodor Timofeevich (1810—1873)
 Nikolay Fyodorovich (1840—1896) — director of the Russian Steam Navigation and Trading Company (1884—1894), patron
 Ekaterina Timofeevna (1812—1877) ∞ Mikhail Petrovich Lazarev (1788—1851) — admiral
 Alexandra Yefremovna ∞ Alexei Mikhailovich Kornilov (1760—1843)
 Vladimir Alexeyevich Kornilov (1806—1854) — vice-admiral, hero of the defense of Sevastopol

References

Literature 
 Герб Фан-дер-Флита внесен в 
 Род:Фан-дер-Флит on Rodovid
 

Russian noble families